= Eurasian landmass =

Eurasian landmass may refer to:

- Eurasia, the combined landmass of Europe and Asia
- Eurasian Plate, the tectonic plate covering Eurasia
- Euro-Asian Steppe, the vast steppe ecoregion of Eurasia
